Exes may also refer to:

 "Exes", a song on Hymns (Bloc Party album)
 The Exes, a U.S. television series
 The Exes (band), who perform on Nashville (2012 TV series)
 Plural of ex (relationship), former spouses etc.

See also
 The X's